China Dialogue is an independent, non-profit organisation based in London and Beijing. It was launched on July 3, 2006. China Dialogue is funded by a range of institutional supporters, including several major charitable foundations.

It focuses on the environment, especially in China, although it has an interest in environment and sustainability issues around the world.

It features articles by Chinese and non-Chinese authors from a variety of perspectives. These include an interview with former US vice-president Al Gore and Chinese economist Hu Angang. Other contributors include Pan Yue who was named New Statesman Person of the Year 2007, and Ma Jun a leading Chinese environmentalist named by Time magazine as one of its 100 most important people in 2006.

Board members
The executive board is chaired by Tom Burke.

References

Further reading
China Digital Times announces chinadialogue's launch
Al Gore interview with chinadialogue covered on danwei.org
人民网就全球变暖问题采访"中外对话"总编伊莎贝尔 ·希尔顿 Transcript of China Central Television interview with editor Isabel Hilton
Salon.com covers chinadialogue article
Chinadialogue on Time Magazine blog

External links

Chinese-language mass media
British environmental websites
Environmental issues in China
Multilingual websites